In the mathematical field of model theory, the elementary diagram of a structure is the set of all sentences with parameters from the structure that are true in the structure. It is also called the complete diagram.

Definition

Let M be a structure in a first-order language L. An extended language L(M) is obtained by adding to L a constant symbol ca for every element a of M. The structure M can be viewed as an L(M) structure in which the symbols in L are interpreted as before, and each new constant ca is interpreted as the element a. The elementary diagram of M is the set of all L(M) sentences that are true in M (Marker 2002:44).

See also

 Diagram (model theory)

References

 
 
 

Model theory